UFC Fight Night: Santos vs. Anders (also known as UFC Fight Night 137) was a mixed martial arts event produced by the Ultimate Fighting Championship held on September 22, 2018 at Ginásio do Ibirapuera in São Paulo, Brazil.

Background
A light heavyweight bout between former UFC Light Heavyweight Championship challenger Glover Teixeira and Jimi Manuwa was expected to serve as the event headliner. However, Teixeira pulled out on August 14 due to a shoulder injury. He was replaced by Thiago Santos. In turn, Manuwa pulled out on September 16 due to a torn hamstring and was replaced by Eryk Anders.

Mark Godbeer was briefly scheduled to face Luis Henrique at the event. However, Godbeer pulled out of the fight in early August citing injury and was replaced by promotional newcomer Ryan Spann.

Neil Magny was scheduled to face Alex Oliveira at the event. However Magny was removed from the pairing on August 22 in favor of a matchup with Santiago Ponzinibbio in November at UFC Fight Night: Magny vs. Ponzinibbio. He was replaced by Carlo Pedersoli Jr.

Ketlen Vieira was expected to face former Invicta FC Bantamweight Champion and UFC Women's Featherweight Championship challenger Tonya Evinger at the event. However on August 7, Vieira pulled out due to a knee injury. Evinger was removed from the card and then rescheduled for a future event against a different opponent.

The Ultimate Fighter: Nations middleweight winner Elias Theodorou was expected to face The Ultimate Fighter: Brazil 3 heavyweight winner Antônio Carlos Júnior at the event. However, Júnior pulled out on August 28 due to injury. The pairing was left intact and rescheduled for UFC 231.

Elizeu Zaleski dos Santos was expected to face Belal Muhammad at the event. However on September 14, it was announced that Muhammad pulled out due to injury and was replaced by promotional newcomer Luigi Vendramini.

At the weigh-ins, former UFC Bantamweight Champion Renan Barão weighed in at 141.6 pounds, 5 pounds over the bantamweight non-title fight limit of 136. Barão was fined 30 percent of his purse, which went to his opponent Andre Ewell.

Results

Bonus awards

The following fighters received $50,000 bonuses:
Fight of the Night: Thiago Santos vs. Eryk Anders
Performance of the Night: Antônio Rogério Nogueira and Charles Oliveira

See also
List of UFC events
2018 in UFC
List of current UFC fighters

References

UFC Fight Night
2018 in mixed martial arts
2018 in Brazilian sport
Mixed martial arts in Brazil
Sport in São Paulo
September 2018 sports events in South America
Sports competitions in São Paulo